The USC Jimmy Iovine and Andre Young Academy (also known as USC Iovine and Young Academy, the Academy, or IYA) is located at the University of Southern California in the United States. The Academy is the university’s 20th professional school.

The Iovine and Young Academy is highly competitive and admits a small cohort of students each year. The program seeks to empower the next generation of thought leaders, innovators and entrepreneurs through a uniquely integrated curriculum focused on the intersection of arts and design; technology; venture management; and communication. The school's four-year cohort experience involves one-on-one faculty mentoring, industry and impact labs, and interactive learning. , Academy startups have raised more than $120 million in funding and acquisition payouts.

History 
The Academy was founded in 2013 following a $70 million donation by Jimmy Iovine and Andre (Dr. Dre) Young.

Erica Muhl served as the Academy's founding dean from 2013 to 2021. On July 8, 2021, it was announced that Thanassis Rikakis, a professor of bioengineering at Virginia Tech, would be joining the Academy as its second dean. His tenure began August 23, 2021.

The Academy offers a Bachelor of Science degree in Arts, Technology, and the Business of Innovation.  In 2017, the Academy launched a new online professional master's degree program in Integrated Design, Business and Technology.

Iovine and Young Hall 

Iovine and Young Hall opened on October 2, 2019. It is a three-story, 40,000-square-foot building designed "for instruction, design and fabrication, conversation and collaboration, and chance meetings that spark inspiration." The school houses a fabrication lab for metal, wood, plastics, and electronics; a multimedia lab for motion capture, photo, video, and audio; an adaptive studio/lecture classrooms; an alumni incubator for Academy student-founded companies; and a podcast booth.

References 

University of Southern California
Schools of the University of Southern California